Copella carsevennensis is a species of fish in the splashing tetra family found in the upper Amazon basin, in the coastal tributaries and rivers of Amapá and The Guianas. They grow no more than a few centimeters in length and typically congregate near the surface of clear-water creeks and streams. They feed on mayfly larvae and ants. They spawn their eggs onto sunken leaves that the male guards.

References

Fish of Guyana
Fish of Brazil
Fish of Suriname
Fish of French Guiana
Taxa named by Charles Tate Regan
Fish described in 1912
Lebiasinidae